Keith Payson Lincoln (May 8, 1939 – July 27, 2019) was an American professional football player who was a running back for eight seasons in the American Football League (AFL). He played college football for the Washington State Cougars before choosing to play with the San Diego Chargers in the AFL over the established National Football League (NFL). Lincoln was a two-time All-AFL selection and a five-time AFL All-Star. A member of the Chargers Hall of Fame, he won an AFL championship with San Diego in 1963, when he was named the most valuable player (MVP) of the championship game. He had a stint with the Buffalo Bills before returning to San Diego and finishing his career.

Early years
Born in Reading, Michigan, on May 8, 1939, Lincoln graduated in 1957 from Monrovia High School in Monrovia, California, in Los Angeles County. He played college football at Washington State University (WSU) in Pullman, Washington. Originally a quarterback on the Cougars' freshman team, he was moved to halfback and was also the team's punter. He was nicknamed the "Moose of the Palouse", given to him by a sportswriter from Spokane.

Lincoln was inducted into the WSU Athletic Hall of Fame  and the State of Washington Sports Hall of Fame in 1980. In 1995, he was named to Washington State's all-time team by a panel of experts commissioned by The Spokesman-Review to commemorate the 100th anniversary of the school's football program.

Professional career
Lincoln began his career with the San Diego Chargers, who selected him in the 1961 AFL draft, choosing them over the Chicago Bears of the more established NFL. As a rookie in 1961, he had a 91-yard reception for a touchdown, the longest catch in the AFL that year. His 86- and 76-yard touchdown runs in 1962 and 1963, respectively, were the league's longest run in those seasons. His 103-yard kickoff return for a touchdown in 1963 was the AFL's longest that year, and is tied for the Chargers team record with Darren Sproles (2008).

In the 1963 AFL championship game, Lincoln was voted the game MVP after the Chargers routed the Boston Patriots 51-10. It remains the only league title in the franchise's history, as well as the city of San Diego's only championship in a major sports league. In the game, Lincoln carried the ball 13 times for 206 yards and had seven catches for 123 yards, compiling an AFL-record 329yards from scrimmage; he also passed for 20 yards. The record stood for both AFL and NFL players until 1971, when Ed Podolak gained 350 for the Kansas City Chiefs in a double-overtime playoff game against the Miami Dolphins. Lincoln's 206 yards rushing remained an NFL playoff record for 22 years, when Eric Dickerson of the Los Angeles Rams gained 248 against the Dallas Cowboys in 1985.

Lincoln was traded to the Buffalo Bills in 1967. He was productive that season, but was waived toward the end of the 1968 season before returning to San Diego and playing one game. Over his eight-year career, Lincoln rushed for 3,383 yards and 19 touchdowns and had 165 receptions for 2,250 yards and 19 touchdowns. He was a two-time All-AFL selection (1963, 1964) and a five-time AFL All-Star (1962–1965, 1967), twice being named the game's MVP (1963, 1964). He was inducted into the Chargers Hall of Fame in 1980, and was also named to their 40th and 50th anniversary teams.

Later years
After retiring as a player, Lincoln was a college assistant coach for the Idaho Vandals in 1970 under first-year head coach Don Robbins. He became an assistant coach at his alma mater WSU in 1971 under fourth-year head coach Jim Sweeney, and later became the school's long-time director of alumni relations.

Personal life
Lincoln was married to Bonnie Jo Lincoln ( McKarcher). They had two sons, Lance and Keith (nicknamed "Kip").

Lincoln died at age eighty of congestive heart failure at Pullman Regional Hospital on July 27, 2019.

See also
 List of American Football League players

References

External links
 
Washington State University Athletics Hall of Fame – Keith Lincoln
State of Washington Sports Hall of Fame – Keith Lincoln
Obituary from Lewiston Tribune

 

1939 births
2019 deaths
American football running backs
Buffalo Bills players
Idaho Vandals football coaches
San Diego Chargers players
Washington State Cougars football coaches
Washington State Cougars football players
American Football League All-Star players
People from Hillsdale County, Michigan
Players of American football from Michigan
American Football League players